The 1986 Copa Banco Galicia was a men's tennis tournament held in Buenos Aires, Argentina that was part of the 1986 Nabisco Grand Prix. The tournament was held from 10 November through 17 November 1986. Unseeded Jay Berger won the singles title.

Finals

Singles

 Jay Berger defeated  Franco Davín 6–3, 6–3
 It was Berger's only title of the year and the 1st of his career.

Doubles
 Loïc Courteau /  Horst Skoff defeated  Gustavo Luza /  Gustavo Tiberti 3–6, 6–4, 6–3
 It was Courteau's only title of the year and the 1st of his career. It was Skoff's only title of the year and the 1st of his career.

References

External links 
 ITF tournament edition details

Copa Banco Galicia
Copa Banco Galicia, 1986
Copa Banco Galicia
November 1986 sports events in South America